The following is a list of programs broadcast on EBC-Net 25, a terrestrial/cable satellite Internet television network owned by Eagle Broadcasting Corporation in the Philippines.

Net 25 currently airs all of its station-produced programs and news broadcasts. It is also the home of the TeleRadyo programs produced by Radyo Agila.

Current original programming

News
Kada Umaga 
Mata ng Agila 
Mata ng Agila International 
Mata ng Agila Weekend 
Net 25 News Update

Current affairs
(A.S.P.N.) Ano sa Palagay Niyo? 
Counterpoint with Atty. Salvador Panelo 
Reality Check with Tito Sotto 
Responde: Mata ng Mamamayan 
Sa Ganang Mamamayan

Variety
Letters and Music

Game
Tara Game, Agad Agad! Level Up

Drama
GoodWill

Comedy
Anong Meron Kay Abok? 
Love, Bosleng and Tali 
Oh No! It's B.O. (Biro Only) 
Quizon CT (Comedy Theater)

Talk
Korina Interviews 
MOMents

Sports
Mobile Legends: Bang Bang Professional League Season 10 
Pilipinas Super League

Infotainment
Cucina ni Nadia 
Ito ang Tahanan 
Landmarks 
Lingap Stories 
Love and Everythaaang! 
Lutong Daza 
Open for Business 
Unlad: Kaagapay sa Hanapbuhay

Informercials
EZ Shop Asia

Religious (Iglesia ni Cristo)
All Iglesia ni Cristo programs are aired under the unofficial CEBSI/INCTV on Net 25 block.

 Ang Iglesia ni Cristo
 Ang Pagbubunyag
 Artime
 Biblia Ang Sasagot
 Christian Society for the Deaf
 Chronicles 
 Daan ng Buhay
 Don't Give Up
 Executive News
 Gabay sa Mabuting Asal
 Gourmade at Home
 #Hashtag
 Iglesia ni Cristo and the Bible
 Iglesia ni Cristo News Weekend
 INCinema
 INC International Edition
 INC Kids Adventure
 INC News World
 Landas ng Buhay
 Lingap sa Mamamayan
 Little Juan's Playlist
 Musiko
 New Normal
 Negosyuniversity
 Paninindigan
 Pasugo
 Pundasyon
 Reconnect
 Time to Draw Live
 Trabaho Ko To
 Turning Point
 Your Light Forever

Current acquired programming

Foreign drama
A Place in the Sun 
Daydreamer 
Fatal Promise 
Mi Esperanza 
Never Twice 
Palabra de Amor 
Two Sisters 
Mysterious Personal Shopper (2023)

Children's

Miffy's Adventures Big and Small 
Transformers: Rescue Bots 
Sunny Girl No.23

Movie block
Sine Throwback

Technology
Rev

Future programming 
Kada Bente Singko 
Magandang ARAw 
Harap-Harapan with Harry Roque

Previously aired

See also
Net 25- a terrestrial/cable television network owned by Eagle Broadcasting Corporation

References

Net 25